The Shanghai Museum bamboo strips is a collection of ancient Chinese texts from the Chu state dating to the Warring States period and written in ink on strips of bamboo. The texts originated through illegal excavation, probably of a tomb in Hubei or Hunan province. They appeared on the Hong Kong market in 1994, and were acquired by the Shanghai Museum. The large size of the collection and the significance of the texts for scholarship make it one of the most important discoveries of early Chinese texts.

The manuscripts have been published in nine volumes by the Shanghai Museum starting in 2001, under the supervision of Ma Chengyuan 馬承源.

See also
 Guodian Chu Slips
 Shuanggudui
 Yinqueshan Han Slips
 Zhangjiashan Han bamboo texts
 Tsinghua Bamboo Slips

References

External links
 《上海博物館藏戰國楚竹書》（1-8冊）總目錄

Bamboo and wooden slips
Archaeological artifacts of China
Chu (state)
Collection of the Shanghai Museum